Formula 1 98 is a racing video game developed by Visual Science and published by Psygnosis exclusively for PlayStation. It is the sequel to the 1997 video game Formula 1 97 and was based on the 1998 Formula One World Championship.

Overview
Following the departure of Bizarre Creations, Psygnosis offered Reflections Interactive the chance to develop Formula 1 98, but they pulled out to make Driver. Visual Science were hired to make the game. The game was then rushed for release to coincide with the final race of the 1998 Formula One World Championship. As a result of this, the game ended up being very poorly-received by various gaming publications. Despite this, the game was a best-seller in the UK.

Circuits
The game features 16 official Formula One circuits based on the 1998 Formula One World Championship plus 2 hidden tracks which can be accessed with cheat codes. One is based upon a Hippodrome, although it says "Coloseum" in the selection screen and the other one is a Stunttrack.

Teams and drivers
The game features all of the official teams and drivers that competed in the 1998 Formula One World Championship, although like with its predecessor, Formula 1 97, Jacques Villeneuve's name and image are not featured due to him copyrighting both. The game refers to him as 'Williams Driver 1'.

Reception

The game received "average" reviews according to the review aggregation website GameRankings. PlayStation Power gave it a review of 69%, noting that "Psygnosis have managed to cock up the one uncockupable licence on the PlayStation" and that it was far worse than both F1 '97 and the original F1 game on the PlayStation.

In February 1999, Formula 1 98 received a "Platinum" sales award from the Verband der Unterhaltungssoftware Deutschland (VUD), indicating sales of at least 200,000 units across Germany, Austria and Switzerland.

References

External links
 

1998 video games
Formula One video games
Multiplayer and single-player video games
PlayStation (console) games
PlayStation (console)-only games
Video game sequels
Psygnosis games
Video games developed in the United Kingdom